Callithia is a genus of moths in the family Sesiidae.

Species
Callithia oberthueri Le Cerf, 1916

References

Sesiidae